K-factor or K factor may refer to:

Engineering and technology
 K-factor (aeronautics), the number of pulses expected for every one volumetric unit of fluid passing through a given flow meter
 K-factor (centrifugation), relative pelleting efficiency of a given centrifuge rotor
 K factor (crude oil refining), a system for classifying crude oil
 K-factor (fire protection), formula used to calculate the discharge rate from a fire system nozzle
 K factor (traffic engineering), the proportion of annual average daily traffic occurring in an hour

Mathematics and statistics
 K-factor (actuarial), the ratio of the value of deferrable expenses to the value of estimated gross profits
 k-factor (graph theory), a spanning k-regular subgraph in graph theory

Telecommunications
 K-factor, the circular segment of earth profile that blocks off long-distance communications in line-of-sight propagation

Other uses
 K-factor (Elo rating system), a constant used in Elo rating system
 K-factor (marketing), the growth rate of websites, apps, or a customer base
 K-factor (sheet metal), the ratio of location of the neutral line to the material thickness
 The K Factor, a fictional TV show within Harry Hill's TV Burp
 Bondi k-factor, the "k" in Bondi k-calculus

See also 
 K (disambiguation)
 K-value (disambiguation)